The Gin Club is an Australian folk rock band formed in Brisbane, Queensland in 2004. The band formed when the various members met while frequenting an open mic night at Brisbane pub O'Malley's. The Gin Club have won three Q Song awards and have toured in Canada and the United States.

Discography

Albums

Extended plays

Awards

Queensland Music Awards
The Queensland Music Awards (previously known as Q Song Awards) are annual awards celebrating Queensland, Australia's brightest emerging artists and established legends. They commenced in 2006.

 (wins only)
|-
| 2006
| "Honey Don't"
| Blues and Roots Song of the Year
| 
|-
| rowspan="2" | 2008
| rowspan="2" | "Ten Paces Away" (written by Ben Salter)
| Song of the Year 
| 
|-
| Rock Song of the Year 
| 
|}

References

External links
Official Site
Plus One Records bio
interview from Rave Magazine

Australian folk rock groups
Musical groups from Brisbane
Musical groups established in 2004